Omer Corteyn (10 October 1896 – 16 December 1979) was a Belgian sprinter. He competed in the men's 400 metres at the 1920 Summer Olympics.

References

External links
 

1896 births
1979 deaths
Athletes (track and field) at the 1920 Summer Olympics
Belgian male sprinters
Olympic athletes of Belgium
Place of birth missing